El Rayo-X is David Lindley's debut studio album, released in 1981.
The album spent 18 weeks on the Billboard 200, peaking at No. 83 on July 16, 1981.

Reception
The album generally received favorable reviews.
Boo Browning, of The Washington Post, wrote:
In a retrospective review, AllMusic's Matthew Greenwald stated:

Track listing
Side 1
"She Took Off My Romeos" (Bob "Frizz" Fuller) – 3:00
"Bye Bye Love" (Boudleaux Bryant, Felice Bryant) – 2:50
"Mercury Blues" (K. C. Douglas, Bob Geddins) – 3:33
"Quarter of a Man" (Bob "Frizz" Fuller) – 3:45
"Ain't No Way" (Bob "Frizz" Fuller) – 3:42
"Twist and Shout" (Phil Medley, Bert Russell) – 2:44
Side 2
"El Rayo-X" (Jorge Calderón, David Lindley) – 2:53
"Your Old Lady" (Elmo Glick, O'Kelly Isley, King Curtis) – 4:14
"Don't Look Back" (Smokey Robinson, Ronald White) – 3:55
"Petit Fleur" (Solomon Feldthouse, Nancy Lindley) – 3:11
"Tu-Ber-Cu-Lucas and the Sinus Blues" (Huey "Piano" Smith) – 2:14
"Pay the Man" (David Lindley, George "Baboo" Pierre) – 3:30

Personnel

Musicians
 David Lindley – bass (track 8), fiddle, guitar, violin, guitar (electric), vocals, whistle (human), slide guitar, bandurria, divan saz
 Bob Glaub – bass (all tracks except 6, 8, 10–11)
 George "Ras Baboo" Pierre – percussion, timbales, vocals, (all tracks), accordion on "Pay the Man"
 William D. "Smitty" Smith – organ, keyboards (tracks 1, 5–7, 11–12)
 Ian Wallace – drums
 Reggie McBride – bass (tracks 6, 10–11)
 Curt Bouterse – hammer dulcimer on "Petit Fleur"
 Jackson Browne – vocals on "Bye Bye Love", "Twist and Shout" and "Don't Look Back"
 Jorge Calderón – vocals on "Twist and Shout"
 Garth Hudson – horn, keyboards on "El Rayo-X"
 Bill Payne – organ, keyboards on "Bye Bye Love"

Technical
 Greg Ladanyi – engineer, producer
 Jackson Browne – producer
 George Ybara, Jamie Ledner – assistant engineers
 Doug Sax, Mike Reese – mastering
 Jimmy Wachtel – art direction, design
 Gloria Von Jansky – lettering
 Kaz Sakamoto – photography

Awards and Charts

Billboard charts

RPM charts

References

1981 debut albums
David Lindley (musician) albums
Asylum Records albums
Albums produced by Greg Ladanyi
Albums with cover art by Jimmy Wachtel